The West Monmouthshire by-election was a Parliamentary by-election held on 3 November 1904. The constituency returned one Member of Parliament (MP) to the House of Commons of the United Kingdom, elected by the first past the post voting system.

The seat was vacant following the death of the seat's incumbent MP Sir William Vernon Harcourt. Thomas Richards was elected in his place.

Result

supported Tariff Reform

References

West Monmouthshire by-election
West Monmouthshire by-election
1900s elections in Wales
West Monmouthshire by-election
By-elections to the Parliament of the United Kingdom in Welsh constituencies